Tan Kim Ching (1829 – 27 February 1892), also known as Tan Kim Cheng, was a Chinese politician and businessman. He was the eldest of the three sons of Tan Tock Seng, the founder and financier of Tan Tock Seng Hospital. He was consul for Japan, Thailand and Russia, and was a member of the Royal Court of Siam. He was one of Singapore's leading Chinese merchants and was one of its richest men in Singapore at that time. He was also the first Asian member of the Straits Branch of the Royal Asiatic Society. After his father's death, he became the Kapitan Cina of the Straits Chinese community. He is believed to have been the head of the Triad in Malaya.

Business career
Tan was one of Singapore's leading Chinese merchants, one of the richest men in Singapore and had sizable business interests in Singapore, Siam, Vietnam and Malaya. His business boomed with rice mills he owned in Bangkok and Saigon. 

He helped to manage his father's firm, "Tan Tock Seng", which is named after his father. After his father's death, the firm was renamed as "Tan Kim Ching" after him. The business was carried on at "River-Side" (now known as Boat Quay) from 1851 to 1859 with him as the sole owner. In 1860, Tan admitted his brother Tan Swee Lim as a partner, the firm was renamed as "Tan Kim Ching & Brother". Tan Swee Lim left the firm after a few months. The firm was finally renamed as "Kim Ching & Co.". With considerable success at the firm, Tan subsequently bought rice mills at Saigon, Siam, and elsewhere which supplied him with his milled rice. In 1888, the company opened a branch in Hong Kong.

Tan also had mining concessions and had tin mining operations in the Kra Isthmus, Patani, Mount Ophir, Kampong Rusa, and various other places. 

He was  also one of the earliest merchants to import silk from China. 

In 1863, Tan paid $120,000 to set up the Tanjong Pagar Dock Company and purchased two steamships, Siam and Singapore.

In 1866, Tan, along with William Henry Macleod Read (Chairman of the Straits Chamber of Commerce), secured the lease for Klang from Raja Abdullah bin Raja Jaafar, the administrator of Klang. Among the benefits of this lease arrangement was being able to collect taxes. Their attempts to collect taxes from Raja Mahdi whose father Raja Sulaiman was Klang's headman, however, sparked off a civil war that became known as The Klang War or The Selangor Civil War.

Some historians have said that the history of Kra Buri began with its governor, Tan Kim Ching.

Diplomatic career 
Tan played a significant role in fostering relationships between Singapore and the colonial government on the one hand, and Siam and its ruler King Mongkut (Rama IV) on the other.

He helped Sir Harry Ord secure a new treaty with Kedah in 1867, and played an integral role in ending the Larut wars by getting Abdullah to seek British intervention, which led to the signing of treaties at Pangkor.

When the Hokkien-Teochew Riots which broke out on 5 May 1854 over 400 people were killed during 10 days of violence. In a meeting with British authorities, Tan Kim Ching represented the Hokkiens and with his assurance and that of Seah Eu Chin of the Teochews, the situation was brought to an end.

In March 1878 The Straits Asiatic Society (formed on 4 November 1877) was renamed The Straits Branch of the Royal Asiatic Society and Tan Kim Ching was one of its founding members.

Tan had a very close relationship with the royal family of Siam and often served as their go-between. In recognising the importance of his role, he was appointed ‘the first Siamese Consul in Singapore’ by King Mongkut in 1863 and in 1885, King Chulalongkorn elevated his title to that of consul-general. He was bestowed the royal title Phraya Astongt Disrarak Siamprajanukulkij. He was also Special Commissioner for Siam in the Straits Settlements.

He introduced his business partner in Singapore, Read, to the Siamese king in the late-1850s when the king desired to get out of a disadvantageous treaty with France.

He had great influence on the Chinese outside the colony, especially in the northern Malay States bordering Siam, Kelantan and Patani (originally all the Malay states were vassals of Siam but British intervention brought them under the control of the British Empire as "independent states". Eventually Patani was reannexed in 1909 as part of the Kingdom of Siam). Exercising this influence, during the time of Sir Andrew Clarke, Tan Kim Ching was instrumental in settling a difficulty that arose between the Siamese and Perak governments.

King Mongkut of Siam (also known as King Rama IV) wanted someone to educate his immediate family without the person attempting to convert them to Christianity while educating them. He turned to Tan for a recommendation. On a suggestion from William Adamson of The Borneo Company, Tan recommended Anna Leonowens, a teacher in Singapore who is looking for work to support herself and her two children.

When the King and Queen of Siam landed in Singapore in 1890 they stayed at Tan's home, "Siam House", in North Bridge Road. It was reported that the king, who was expected to arrive in Singapore at Tanjong Pagar Wharf on board the royal vessel Ubon Burratit on 30 May 1890, had landed at Johnston's Pier instead. Due to the late arrival, only Tan was at the pier to receive him.

When the king wished to acquire property in Singapore, he turned to Tan for recommendations which resulted in the acquisition of "Hurricane House" in the vicinity of Orchard Road.

Political career 
In 1860 the Hokkien Huay Kuan was established in the premises of the Thian Hock Keng at Telok Ayer Street and Tan was installed as its first leader. He held the position of president for 30 years. He was especially noted for his establishment of a marriage registry for the Hokkiens.

In 1864, he was elected to the grand jury as one of five Chinese members on the jury.

In 1865 he was made a Justice of the Peace by the British Straits Settlements government.

In 1888, he was appointed to the municipal council.

Towards the end of his life he was prosecuted for keeping slaves, but he was discharged.

Philanthropy

Tan Tock Seng Hospital
On 25 July 1844, the foundation stone of the Tan Tock Seng Hospital was laid on Pearl's Hill. The stone was laid but the construction took three years. After that the hospital stayed empty for another two years because of insufficient funding. In 1852, in order to ease overcrowding at the hospital founded by his father Tan Tock Seng, Tan offered to bear the cost of additions to the building, approximately two thousand dollars ($2,000). His generous gesture led to many other merchants increasing monthly subscriptions to Tan Tock Seng Hospital.

By 1854, the additions were completed. An inscription engraved in stone at the hospital gate acknowledges the donation of $3,000 by Tan Kim Ching. After all of that it was decided that the Tan Tock Seng Hospital had to move as the government wanted to build a new building. Tan agreed to the move, on condition that the rebuilt hospital should not cost less than the original one. He also requested a female ward, which his mother paid for in 1858 to perpetuate the memory of Tan Tock Seng. In 1858, two years after the government's decision to acquire Pearl's Hill, construction work began and Tan Kim Ching donated an additional $3,340.

Tan Si Chong Su
Tan together with Tan Swee Beng donated funds to build an ancestral temple to serve the needs of the Tan clan (people bearing the Tan surname) and in 1876 the Tan Si Chong Su was built.

School funding
In 1849, when the Chinese school Chung Wen Ge was built, he donated $100.

In 1854, he donated $150 towards the construction of the Chui Eng School.

The Larut Wars and The Pangkor Engagement
 See articles at Larut War and Pangkor Engagement

Tan Kim Ching was a member of the Ghee Hin secret society and a supporter of the Raja Muda Abdullah of Perak and the Ghee Hin in Larut. It was Tan Kim Ching who had encouraged Abdullah to write seeking the involvement of the British.

Released from his arrest at sea, and his temporary incarceration on Penang, and forbidden return to Perak, Abdullah ventured to Singapore in October 1873 to seek help from the Ghee Hin there. Had Ngah Ibrahim not already aligned himself with the Hai San, he would not have got it. As it was, he arrived at an accommodation with Tan Kim Ching whose influence among the Chinese, at that time, was without comparison. After going through the introduction provided by the Ghi Hin from Penang Tan Kim Ching offered to put Abdullah on the throne in return for five elevenths (5/11) of all duties collected between Telok Serah and Krian for a period of ten years.

Tan Kim Ching together with an English merchant in Singapore (W. H. M. Read) drafted a letter to Governor Sir Andrew Clarke, which Abdullah signed, in which Raja Muda Abdullah expressed his desire to place Perak under British protection, and "to have a man of sufficient abilities to show him a good system of government."

In the British intervention in Malaya 1867-1877 Parkinson tells us that Sir Andrew Clarke, just weeks after his arrival in Singapore, had already found evidence of the continuing disturbances in Perak and Selangor. Apart from his executive council, he talked to Tan Kim Cheng. Clarke decided that both the Hai San and Ghee Hin should have access to Larut with neither side being excluded, a complete reversal of the policy of his predecessor, Sir Harry Ord. Tan Kim Ching agreed and wrote to the Ghee Hin on Penang to put this to them and advocate peace.

Clarke then sent Pickering to Penang to talk to the respective headmen in Penang. Pickering gave Tan Kim Ching's letter to Chin Ah Yam. Twenty Ghee Hin headmen met through the night at the Ghee Hin Kongsi house considering Tan Kim Cheng's letter. In the morning they met with Pickering and agreed to surrender their forces in seven days time.

Following that outcome and the outcome of a meeting with Chung Keng Quee whom Pickering also met, Sir Andrew Clarke then gathered the main Chinese leaders (principally Chung Keng Quee and Chin Ah Yam) and some Malays – including Abdullah – at Pulau Pangkor where the "Pangkor Engagement" was formulated and signed, recognising Abdullah as Sultan, and getting the Chinese to agree to settle their differences in Larut under British arbitration.

Singapore syndicates
During the tenure of Chiu Sin Yong's Revenue Farming syndicate in Singapore, backed by Khoo Thean Poh, Tan testified against Cheang Hong Lim and his group who had mobilized all of their allies and affiliates and organized a conspiracy to scuttle Chiu's farming syndicate. Tan Kim Cheng's testimony was a godsend for Chiu and Khoo. Tan and his father Tan Tock Seng, representing most of the Malacca-born Hokkien, led the Haizhang group while their archrivals Cheang Sam Teo and his son, Cheang Hong Lim led the Zhang Hai group, the division between Hokkien migrants from Quanzhou and Zhangzhou.

Honours
Commander of the Third Class of the Order of the Rising Sun of Japan.
Special letter of thanks from the Governor of the Straits Settlements, Sir Andrew Clarke, for his role in settling a difficulty that arose between the Siamese and Perak governments.
Special letter and honour from China for his contribution to the Famine Fund in 1890.

Personal life
Tan had three wives and a total of 19 children. He had seven children with his first wife, Chua Yee Ren, three children with Khunying, Puen Anukulsiamkit, and nine children in his third marriage.

His eldest daughter, Tan Cheng Gay, who had been taught Chinese and also a little English, was the first among those appointed trustees of his estate to take out probate of his will, one of the rare instances of a Chinese lady being appointed and assuming the duties of executrix of the will of a Chinese testator.

Five of his grandsons (and who were all sons of Tan Soon Toh), Tan Boo Liat, Tan Cheow Pin, Tan Kwee Liang, Tan Kwee Swee and Tan Kwee Wah were well known members of the Chinese community.

Death 
Tan died of suspected heart disease on 27 February 1892 and his remains were interred at his private burial ground at the thirteenth mile on the Changi Road. His grave was transferred to Bukit Brown in 1940.

Legacy
The setting up of the Tao Nan School, established on 18 November 1906, financed by the Hokkien Huay Kuan (which was led by Tan Kim Ching before he died), was initiated by Tan Boo Liat, the grandson of Tan Kim Ching. Tan Kim Ching's residence at Siam House served as temporary grounds for the school which moved to its own premises in Armenian Street and later Marine Parade (1982).

There are two roads named after him in Singapore: the Tan Kim Cheng Road in Bukit Timah and the Kim Cheng Street in Tiong Bahru.

In 2014, a plaque was installed in Kim Cheng Street which narrate the life of Tan.

References

Further reading
"Singapore Story" by the National Library Board of Singapore
James Brooke of Sarawak: A Biography of Sir James Brooke - Page 251 by Emily Hahn - 1953 - 271 pages, Published 1953 by A. Barker
An Ode To Friendship—Celebrating Thailand-Singapore Relations, Mr Wong Wee Hon, Head (Archives Reference Room), National Archives of Singapore
Tanjong Pagar: A Pictorial Journey (1819–1989) = Tan-Jung Pa-Ko T'u P'Ien Chi - Page 88 1989 - 149 pages Published 1989 by Tanjong Pagar Citizens'Consultative Committee
The Kuomintang Movement in British Malaya, 1912-1949 By Ching Fatt Yong, R. B. McKenna Published 1990, SUP
Singapore: Wealth, Power And The Culture Of Control By Carl A. Trocki Published 2006 Routledge (UK)
The Greek Favourite of the King of Siam - Page xiv by Sitsayamkan (Sit) - 1967 - 362 pages Published 1967 Donald Moore Press
Handbook to Singapore with Map, and a Plan of the Botanical Gardens By George Murray Reith Published 1892 Singapore and Straits Print. Off.
Anna and the King of Siam - Page 74 by Margaret Landon, Lessing J. Published 1944 John Day Company, Incorporated
Thailand: an introduction to modern Siam - Page 63 by Noel Fairchild Busch - 1959 - 166 pages Published 1959 Van Nostrand
The Political Economy of Siam, 1910-1932 - Page 127 by Chatthip Nartsupha, Suthy Prasartset, Montri Chenvidyakarn, Samākhom Sangkhommasāt hǣng Prathēt Thai, Montrī Čhēnwitkān - 1981 - 253 pages Published 1981 Social Science Association of Thailand
Manners and Customs of the Chinese of the Straits Settlements - Page 112 by Jonas Daniel Vaughan - 1971 - 136 pages Published 1974 Oxford University Press
The American Neptune ... - Page 113 by Peabody Museum of Salem - 1941 Published 1941 Peabody Museum of Salem
Play and Politics: Recollections of Malaya by W. H. M. Read - 1901 - 178 pages Page 38 Published 1901 Darto
The Management of Success: the moulding of modern Singapore By Kernial Singh Sandhu, Paul Wheatley, Syed Hussein Alatas Published 1989 Institute of Southeast Asian Studies 
Chinese Business in the Making of a Malay State, 1882-1941 By Walter Ullmann, Xiao An Wu, Kedah and Penang Published 2003 Routledge (UK) 
Journal of the Straits Branch of the Royal Asiatic Society - Page xii by Royal Asiatic Society of Great Britain and Ireland. Malaysian Branch - Published 1922
Singapore Then & Now, Ray Tyers, University Education Press, 1976
The London Illustrated News, 6 March 1858
The Free Press, 31 May 1890
The Sunday Times, 30 November 1969
A King of Siam Speaks By M.R. Kukrit Pramoj, Mongkut, Seni Pramoj Published 1987 by The Siam Society 
From Competition to Constraint: The International Rice Trade in the Nineteenth and Twentieth Centuries, A. J. H. Latham, University of Wales, Swansea
Tao Nan School by Mr Dhoraisingam S. Samuel
Lim Siew Yeen & Renuka M, National Library Board, Singapore, 2002
The King of Siam's Eclipse: The Total Solar Eclipse of 18 August 1868 by Heather Hobden
Ancestors of Claudine Chionh, Claudine Chionh, 2005
Lawrence Tan's Family Tree, Lawrence Tan
Koh Saeng Tat - The Opium King by Carl A Trocki
Lecture 3.2 The underside of Development, Topic 3: Singapore's Economic Development, Associate Professor Karl Hack, Humanities and Social Studies Education Academic Group, National Institute of Education
Class Structure and Social Mobility in the Chinese Community in Singapore and Malaya 1800-1911
Yen Ching-Hwang Modern Asian Studies, Vol. 21, No. 3 (1987), pp. 417–445
Chinese Capitalism and the British Empire By Carl A. Trocki—A paper presented to the International Association of Historians of Asia, Conference, Taiwan, Taipei, 6–10 December 2004
The Siamese Royal Agent in Singapore: The Activities of Tan Kim Ching by Miyamata, Toshiyuki., Southeast Asia: History & Culture, Number 31, 30 May 2002
"Rescuing Businesses through Transnationalism: Embedded Chinese Enterprise and Nationalist Activities in Singapore in the 1930s Great Depression" by Kuo, Huei-Ying, Enterprise & Society - Volume 7, Number 1, March 2006, pp. 98–127
The rice trade between Siam and Singapore in the late nineteenth century : Tan Kim Ching and Siam 'Garden Rice' by Toshiyuki Miyata
The Straits Settlements, 1826-67: Indian Presidency to Crown Colony By Constance Mary Turnbull Published by Athlone Press, 1972; pp. 32, 125, 296
Methodist Schools in Malaysia: Their Record and History By Seng Ong Ho Published by Board of Education, Malaya Annual Conference, 1965; p. 209
American Association of Singapore, 50th Anniversary: 50th Anniversary By American Association of Singapore, Glenn A. Wood Published by American Association of Singapore, 1967; p. 21
Siam and the British, 1874-75: Sir Andrew Clarke and the Front Palace Crisis By Shunyu Xie Published by Thammasat University Press, 1988; p. 42
Play and Politics, Recollection of Malaya by an Old Resident By William Henry Macleod Read published in London by W. Gardner Darton, 1901 (Call no.: RRARE 959 503 REA); p. 38
Zhongguo hai yang fa zhan shi lun wen ji By Zhongguo hai yang fa zhan shi lun wen ji bian ji wei yuan hui, Zhong yang yan jiu yuan San min zhu yi yan jiu suo, Zhong yang yan jiu yuan Zhongshan ren wen she hui ke xue yan jiu suo Published by Zhong yang yan jiu yuan san min zhu yi yan jiu suo, 1984; Item notes: v.5 (1993)
An Early Surveyor in Singapore: John Turnbull Thomson in Singapore, 1841-1853 By John Hall-Jones, Christopher Hooi Published by National Museum, 1979; p. 135
Nghiên cứu Huế By Trung tâm nghiên cứu Huế Published by Trung tâm nghiên cứu Huế, 2002; Item notes: v.4; p. 70
Estudios del archipiélago asiático: Bajo el punto de vista geográfico, histórico, agrícola, colonial, político y commercial By Balbino Cortés Published by Impr. de A.A. Babi, 1861; p. 114
Xingzhou shi nian By Chupu Guan Published by Xing zhou ri bao, 1940
新社學報 By Island Society (Singapore) Published by Xin she, 1967; Item notes: v.1-3 1967–1969; p. 63
The Siamese Royal Agent in Singapore: The Activities of Tan Kim Ching by MIYATA Toshiyuki Southeast Asia: History and Culture (Academic Journal, 2002 ) 31 /, 27-56

External links
From Competition to Constraint: The International Rice Trade in the Nineteenth and Twentieth Centuries A. J. H. Latham University of Wales, Swansea
Transcultural Diaspora: The Straits Chinese in Singapore, 1819-1918 by MR Frost
The Big Five Hokkien Families in Penang, 1830s–1890s
Chinese Capitalism and the British Empire By Carl A. Trocki A paper presented to the International Association of Historians of Asia, Conference, Taiwan, Taipei, 6-10 December 2004
Straits Times SINGAPORE: TUESDAY, JAN 24TH,1854., Page 4
Tan Kim Cheng's Estate., The Straits Times, 16 December 1913, Page 8
The Straits Times, 3 November 1913, Page 3
The Straits Times, 28 March 1928, Page 7
The Straits Times, 20 November 1913, Page 5
The Straits Times, 3 October 1913, Page 5
The Straits Times, 7 November 1913, Page 10
The Straits Times, 7 March 1913, Page 14
The Straits Times, 24 November 1913, Page 14

1829 births
1892 deaths
Kapitan Cina
Hokkien businesspeople
Tan Kim Ching
Chinese businesspeople
Singaporean people of Hokkien descent
Malaysian businesspeople
Crime bosses
Singaporean gangsters
Singaporean businesspeople
Recipients of the Order of the Rising Sun
People from Malacca
Triad members